Meridian High School (MHS) (formerly George Mason High School) is a comprehensive public high school serving the independent City of Falls Church. Until January 2014, it was located in Idylwood, an unincorporated area of Falls Church, in Fairfax County, Virginia, adjacent to Falls Church City. As part of Fairfax Water's agreement to purchase the Falls Church Water System, the parcel with MHS was transferred to Falls Church City.

The school serves some 850 students in grades 9-12. The school is the sole high school of the Falls Church City Public Schools system.

In 1981, the school became the first in Virginia to use the International Baccalaureate program.

The school ranks gold in U.S. News & World Reports Best High Schools Ranking for 2020; Meridian High School (formerly George Mason) ranks #16 among all schools in Virginia and #649 in the United States.

A design for a new main building was unveiled in 2017 and construction began in 2019. The new LEED-certified building opened to students in 2021, and the original was demolished.

In December 2020, the FCCPS School Board voted to rename George Mason High School and its counterpart Thomas Jefferson Elementary School due to their namesakes' association with American slavery. After a period of deliberation and public comment, the school board selected Meridian High School as a replacement name.

Demographics
Meridian High School's racial breakdown in the 2020-2021 class was 59% White (non-Hispanic), 6% Asian or Pacific Islander, 12% Hispanic, 4% Black, and 19% two or more races. For comparison, the demographics of the city are: 79.37% White, 3.38% Hispanics of any race, 6.5% Asian, 4.9% African American, 0.16% Native American, 0.0% Pacific Islander, 2.01% from other races, and 3.68% from two or more races.

History
MHS was built on the site of a single-room school house which burned down in 1857. After the fire, the land sat empty until Falls Church was founded as an independent city in 1948 when residents sought greater control over their local school system, which, at the time, was segregated by race. MHS, since its establishment in 1952, has become a hub of activity in the city for its facilities and athletic fields.

Sports and activities
VHSL Scholastic Bowl Team - Bull Run District champions for 18 of 19 years between 2000 and 2018, receiving many region and conference titles in those years, seven-time Virginia A State Champions, including four straight years (2002, 2003, 2007, 2010, 2011, 2012, 2013), and five-time state runner-up (2004, 2006, 2009, 2014, 2015). 2011 NAQT national high school small school division quiz bowl champions after a third-place finish in 2007 and fifth in 2010.
Baseball - Bull Run District Champions 2010, 2019 
Boys Basketball - Virginia A D2 State runners-up 2012 
Girls Basketball - Virginia A D2 State Champions (2008–2009, 2009–2010, 2011–2012); Bull Run District runners-up and Region B champions 2007–2008, 2011–12 season.
 Cross Country - Girls State Champions (2008, 2009, 2010, 2011), Girls State Runner-Up (2007, 2005), third (2006), Boys District and Region champs and 4th in state in 2010, sixth in State (2007), Boys District and State Champions (2011) 
American football - Bull Run District Champions 2006 
Golf - Bull Run District Regular Season Champions 2006, 2007 
Field Hockey
Ice Hockey
Boys Lacrosse - Dulles District champions, 2008 
Girls Lacrosse - Dulles District runners-up, 2010  Dulles District Champions 2016, 4A State Runner-ups 2016, 4A State Champions 2017
Boys Soccer - Group A runners-up 2005, 2011. Group A State Champions 2000, 2002, 2004, 2009, 2010, 2013. Group 2A State Champions 2014, 2015, 2016, 2018. Group 3 State Champions 2021. The 2015 team- Ranked #1 in Region I and #2 in Nation by NSCAA. 2016- Ranked #10 in Nation by Max Preps.
Girls Soccer - Group A Champions 2002, 2004, 2008, 2009, 2010, 2011, 2012, 2013. Group 2A State Champions 2014, 2015, 2016, 2017, 2018.
Softball District champions 2012 
Boys Swimming - Bull Run District and Region B Champions 2007, 2008, 2009, 2010, 2012. District and State Champions, 2015.
Girls Swimming - Bull Run District and Region B Champions 2009, 2012. District Champions, 2014. District, Region and State Champions, 2015 
Boys Tennis - Fourteen-time Group A State Champions: 1986–1991, 2001, 2004–2007, 2010–2012.
Girls Tennis - Bull Run District and Region B Champions 2006–2008, 2010.
Track and Field - Girls team third in State in 2007 and 2010, three school records and counting from the class of 2008 runners, girls team second in state (2008). Six individual state championships since 2005.
Volleyball - Bull Run District Champions 2015, Conference 35 Champions 2016, Bull Run District co-champions and Region 2B Runner-ups 2018, Northwestern District Champions 2019, Northwestern District and Region 3B Champions 2020-2021.
Wrestling
FIRST Robotics Competition Team 1418, Vae Victis - Frequent attendee of FIRST World Championship. Top FIRST Robotics Competition team in Chesapeake district in 2016.
Band - Earned "Superior" scores at District X Festival for the past twelve years, the past five of which were earned playing Grade VI music. Also, the music department earned the VBODA "Blue Ribbon Award" for eleven years in a row, 2000–2011.
 Chorus - Consistently earns "Superior" and "Excellent" scores at District X Festival.
Theater - The George Mason High School Theater annually performs a Fall musical and a Spring play.

Notable alumni
Grant Sabatier (2003), author

References

External links
Meridian High School
Meridian High School Faculty and Staff
Photos of Teachers and Administrators from Class of 1964 web page
Some class notes

Public high schools in Virginia
Schools in Falls Church, Virginia
Educational institutions established in 1952
International Baccalaureate schools in Virginia
1952 establishments in Virginia